Lolita Harau was crowned Miss Earth Reunion Island 2014 and competed in the Miss Earth 2014.

External links
 Miss Earth Official Website

Miss Earth 2014 contestants
Beauty pageant winners from Réunion
Living people
Year of birth missing (living people)